Marium Mukhtiar (May 19, 1992  November 24, 2015) was a Pakistani fighter pilot. She died flying a Pakistan Air Force (PAF) FT-7PG aircraft that crashed near Kundian in Mianwali District, northwestern Punjab, Pakistan on November 24, 2015. She was the first female Pakistani fighter pilot to be killed in the line of duty.

Early life and career

Marium Mukhtiar was born into a Sindhi Sheikh family and she was the daughter of Colonel Ahmed Mukhtiar who settled in Karachi, as his home town. She attended the Mehran Model School and College in Pano Akil and intermediate from Army Public School and College (APSACS) in Malir Cantt, Karachi. She played football for Balochistan United in the National Women Football Championship. She studied civil engineering at NED University before qualifying as a fighter pilot in the Pakistan Air Force (PAF) in 2014, along with six other women. She was also involved in charity work, supporting a school for children who were unable to afford an education.

Death 

On 24 November 2015, Mukhtiar and squadron leader Saqib Abbasi were on a routine training mission when their FT-7PG crashed near Kundian, Mianwali, Punjab. Both occupants ejected from the cockpit; Abbasi suffered minor injuries, but Mukhtiar died of her injuries in a military hospital. Mukhtiar and her co-pilot had ejected at too low an altitude, an air force spokesman said. Abbasi survived possibly because he had managed to eject seconds earlier.

Mukhtiar's death was declared a martyrdom (or shahadat) by the PAF, which said both pilots "handled the serious emergency with professionalism and courage and tried to save the ill-fated aircraft until the very last minute. Flying Officer Mukhtiar could have saved her life had she ejected before taking PAF FT-7PG out of populous areas but both pilots decided to take the risk to keep flying the falling jet." 

She is buried in Malir Cantonment Graveyard.

Awards

Pakistan's Senate Standing Committee on Defence (SSCD) recommended Mukhtiar for a state award. She was awarded the Tamgha-e-Basalat by the Government of Pakistan.

Popular culture
 Ek Thi Marium – a 2016 Pakistani biographical telefilm aired by Urdu 1, directed by Sarmad Sultan Khoosat, written by Umera Ahmad, and starring Sanam Baloch as Mukhtiar.

References

External links
Official PAF Documentary on Marium's Life
Marium Mukhtiar Official Website

1992 births
2015 deaths
Aviators killed in aviation accidents or incidents
Pakistan Air Force officers
Pakistani women aviators
Pakistani female military officers
Sindhi people
Pakistani women's footballers
Balochistan United W.F.C. players
Women's association footballers not categorized by position
NED University of Engineering & Technology alumni
Victims of aviation accidents or incidents in 2015